= Richard E. Just =

American economist

Richard Eugene Just is an economist at the University of Maryland. He received his Ph.D. from the University of California, Berkeley, in 1972 with specialization in quantitative policy analysis where he served on the faculty until 1985. In 2007 he commenced consecutive terms as President-Elect, President, and Past President of the American Agricultural Economics Association (AAEA), renamed the Agricultural and Applied Economics Association. He is the author or co-author of over 150 publications including a number of books, most notably ‘’The Welfare Economics of Public Policy’’. The quality of his research has been recognized more often than anyone else by the AAEA during its first 100 years.
